Bodianus busellatus is a species of wrasse native to tropical and warm temperate waters of the south central Pacific, particularly the Marquesas Islands. This species was described by Martin F. Gomon of the Australian Museum in 2006 with the type locality given as northeast of Matakumu Point on Fatu Hiva in the Marquesas Islands. This species is found only in the Marquesas and Pitcairn Islands.

References

Further reading
Justine, Jean-Lou. "Huffmanela spp.(Nematoda, Trichosomoididae) parasites in coral reef fishes off New Caledonia, with descriptions of H. balista n. sp. and H. longa n. sp." Zootaxa 1628 (2007): 23–41.
Lim, L. H. S., and Jean-Lou Justine. "Haliotrema banana sp. n.(Monogenea: Ancyrocephalidae) from Bodianus perditio (Perciformes: Labridae) off New Caledonia." Folia Parasitologica 54.3 (2007): 203.

External links

busellatus
Taxa named by Martin F. Gomon
Fish described in 2006